Amphilius grandis is a species of catfish in the genus Amphilius. It is found in the Tana and Ewaso Ng'iro river basins in Kenya. Its length reaches 18.1 cm.

References 

grandis
Freshwater fish of Africa
Fish described in 1902
Taxa named by George Albert Boulenger